Krasny Liman 2-y is a rural locality (a selo) in Krasnolimanskoye Rural Settlement, Paninsky District, Voronezh Oblast, Russia. The population was 796 as of 2010. There are 5 streets.

Geography 
Krasny Liman 2-y is located 36 km southwest of Panino (the district's administrative centre) by road. Komsomolskoye is the nearest rural locality.

References 

Rural localities in Paninsky District